The Overwatch franchise, a series of first-person shooter games developed by Blizzard Entertainment consists of 36 playable characters across both games. The original 2016 game, Overwatch, featured 32 playable characters known as heroes and a number of supporting characters as part of the game's narrative, which is told through animated media and digital comics outside of the game. Its sequel, Overwatch 2, was released in October 2022 and replaced Overwatch. The sequel builds upon the same hero roster and added more characters, currently consisting of 36 heroes. However, as Overwatch 2 had been developed to be a faster game with five-versus-five teams rather than six-versus-six, several of the characters had tweaks or major rebuilds within Overwatch 2, as well as different character designs. 

The story of Overwatch takes place on Earth in the "near future" in the years after the "Omnic Crisis," a period in which robots (called "omnics") rose up in rebellion worldwide, and the United Nations formed an elite group called Overwatch to combat them. Overwatch continued to protect the peace until it was disbanded years later under a cloud of suspicion, but its former members have returned to the fore in light of new threats to humanity. Blizzard wanted to create a diverse set of characters to reflect a positive outlook on this near future, incorporating non-human characters and non-standard character traits. The game launched with 21 characters, with eleven more added post-release. Nine characters reprised their role as playable heroes in the crossover multiplayer online battle arena game, Heroes of the Storm.

Background
Overwatch is primarily an online team-oriented first-person shooter, and an example of a "hero shooter" where players select from one of several pre-designed hero characters with their own unique abilities. Overwatch includes casual play modes, competitive ranked play modes, and various arcade modes where special rules apply. Most game modes bring together two teams of six players each into a match and compete in one of several objective-based game types based on the randomly selected map, including taking control points and escorting a payload.

A match starts with each player selecting from one of the available hero characters. The game's characters are divided into three role classifications: damage, tank, and support. Damage characters are often doing the most damage and help the team with the majority of kills. Tank characters can absorb large amounts of damage for the team, and support characters share healing abilities and similar status effects for the team or against enemies. The game will warn teams if they have an imbalance in their general role selection, and certain game modes require players to select different heroes. Players are able to switch between heroes mid-match after they are killed or if they return to their team's base.

Each hero character has fundamentally different attributes such as health and movement speed, at least one basic attack, and at least one unique skill, collectively referred to as a skill kit. These skills can be used repeatedly after waiting out the skill's cooldown period. Each character also has at least one powerful ultimate ability that becomes available once its meter is charged, either slowly over time or through other actions such as killing opponents or healing teammates. Once the ultimate ability is used, the player has to wait for the meter to fill again. All characters have a close-combat, low damage melee attack that can be used at any time.

Winning matches earns the player experience towards experience levels in the meta-game. The player earns a loot box on reaching a new experience level, which contain a random assortment of character skins, emotes, speech lines, and other cosmetic items for each character without specific game-changing effects. Players can also purchase loot boxes with real-world money. Blizzard has provided free post-release content for the game, such as new levels and characters. Blizzard has also introduced limited-time seasonal events, offering new cosmetic items in loot boxes, themed levels, and gameplay modes.

Overview
Overwatch originally featured 12 characters at its November 2014 BlizzCon convention announcement, but expanded to 21 by the next year's convention. The game is character-driven, and reviewers noted Overwatch emphasis on the individual differences between characters in the same role (e.g., between two snipers) as a departure from dominant class-based shooter paradigms. Critics widely praised the game's accessible and detailed character design and its role in the game's overall success.

Similar to Valve's initial launch of Team Fortress 2, in the absence of a dedicated story mode, Blizzard tells the backstory of Overwatch plot and characters through media outside the game, including animated shorts, character press events, tweets, and webcomics. The game's story centers around a technological singularity in which humanity assembles a team of its best heroes, Overwatch, to fight off a rogue artificial intelligence and its robotic army of Omnics in an incident called the "Omnic Crisis". After winning its battle, the Overwatch kept the peace for about three decades before infighting led to its disbandment. The game takes place approximately sixty years in the future, during a time period in which the world is slipping into disarray, and former Overwatch members along with new allies, as well as enemies, are being called on to help protect the peace in their respective favors. Among Overwatch's enemies include Talon, a global criminal network seeking wealth and power.

In early 2016, Blizzard released media kits with granular character detail for fan artists and cosplayers. Preceding the game's launch, PornHub reported a surge in searches for pornography including Overwatch characters. An intellectual property security firm issued multiple takedown requests to sites featuring such videos and other erotica created in Source Filmmaker.

Development

Overwatch was developed by Blizzard following the cancellation of a massively multiplayer online role-playing game Titan, a project that had been in works for several years. A smaller team from those on Titan were given the role to come up with a new project, and they came onto the idea of a first-person shooter that emphasized teamwork, inspired by Team Fortress 2 and the rising popularity of multiplayer online battle arenas, as well as their own development team unity they found to keep their morale high following Titans cancellation.

The development team settled on a narrative of a near-future Earth setting following a global-scale catastrophic event - the Omnic Crisis in which robots, known as Omnics, rose up in rebellion against humanity until stopped by a peacekeeping group known as Overwatch. With selection of this global theme, the developers wanted to create a cast of playable characters to portray diverse representations of genders, ages, ethnicities, and nationalities. The heroes include human, transhuman, and non-human characters such as cyborgs, robots, and a talking gorilla. The need for a diverse cast was important to the developers, as some of Blizzard's previous games had been criticized before for missing this mark; Metzen explained that even his daughter had asked him why all the female characters from Warcraft seemed to be only wearing swimsuits. Metzen stated: "Specifically for Overwatch over the past year we've been really cognizant of that, trying not to oversexualize the female characters." Kaplan explained that the industry was "clearly in an age where gaming is for everybody", going on to say that "increasingly, people want to feel represented, from all walks of life, boys and girls, everybody. We feel indebted to do our best to honor that." In addition, Blizzard stated at the 2016 Blizzcon that some of the characters are LGBT, though did not specify which ones at that time. Blizzard has stated that "As with any aspect of our characters' backgrounds, their sexuality is just one part of what makes our heroes who they are." Since then, Tracer has been shown to be in a romantic relationship with another woman through one of the tie-in comics published online by Blizzard. In a subset lore story, Soldier: 76 was also identified as gay, having had a romantic relationship with a man prior to joining Overwatch. A research paper analyzed this announcement and found that players avoided Soldier: 76 afterwards. However, the pick rate returned to previous levels after around three months.

The team envisioned the characters akin to superheroes in this narrative, each with their own abilities, background and personality that could stand on their own, but could also fit into the larger story; this notion translated into the characters being agents for the game, which Metzen said still captures the "heroism and vibe" that superhero stories carry. The team did not want to have any characters that served solely as villains in the game, but did develop some of the characters, like Soldier: 76, to have an unsure purpose within the narrative.

Several characters were envisioned for the game during its pre-planning stages, but did not make the cut, or were later incorporated into other heroes. Among characters that were considered included a jetpack-wearing cat, a hockey player that used rocket-power skates, and a Russian woman that would ride a bear and for which her ultimate ability would have the bear rear up and wield his own set of AK-47 rifles. Initially, Reinhardt was an Omnic, but later was settled to be a human character, with the Omnic nature later revisited when the development team crafted Orisa.

Characters introduced since the game's release are generally teased a few weeks in advance or given a cold surprise announcement. The only exception to this had been Sombra, who had been teased by a months-long alternate reality game (ARG) prior to her formal announcement. Blizzard found players reacted negatively to this deployment, and have opted to avoid this type of prolonged teasing for future characters. Blizzard will still seed upcoming hero characters into the game's announcement media but without making comments towards that, anticipating players would find these before the character is officially announced; for example, the 26th hero Moira had appeared in at least two works prior to her announcement. Once a character is announced, they are typically made available on the "Public Test Region" (PTR) for Windows players to try out and help provide feedback to Blizzard. Once Blizzard is satisfied with the PTR character, typically a period lasting two to three weeks, the character is then released to all players on all regions and platforms, outside of competitive play, as to give players a chance to learn the character. Roughly a week following this, the new character then becomes available for competitive play mode.

Character powers are frequently tweaked and adjusted with patches, mostly incremental changes. A few characters have had major overhauls, notably Symmetra (with two separate overhauls of her skill), Mercy, and Torbjörn. Like new characters, these overhauls are tested in the PTR before released to all public regions. A major notable change, reducing the number of roles from four to three (combining "offense" and "defense" heroes into the "damage" category) was implemented in the PTR before being released for all players in June 2018.

Overwatch 2 was announced in November 2019, with plans for both a normal PvP element as with the original game and a Player versus Environment (PVE) mode. With the introduction of Echo, the 32nd hero to Overwatch, in March 2020, Kaplan stated that the team's focus was now on Overwatch 2 and it was unlikely they would release any additional heroes prior to the game's release.

After some delays, including the departure of Kaplan and lead character designer Geoff Goodman, Overwatch 2 was released in open early access with its PvP mode in October 2022, with the PvE mode to come later in 2023. While at announcement there was some intent to have a shared multiplayer experience between Overwatch and Overwatch 2, Overwatch 2 was instead released as a free to play title, with a player's earned cosmetics brought over into Overwatch 2. Overwatch 2 was designed to play faster and avoid the slow pace that some Overwatch games had become, in part due to the use of "crowd control" (CC) abilities to hamper progress. To correct this, Overwatch 2 is nominally played with five players on each team, with role-fixed games using two damage, two support, and one tank. This necessitated changes to several characters' skill kits to match; notably, Orisa's kit has a significant rework to remove her shield and her CC abilities, while Doomfist was reworked from damage into a tank class. Overwatch 2 also launched with three new heroes, bringing the total roster to 35 by October 2022. With the free to play model, new heroes for Overwatch 2 have been introduced as a free unlock on a seasonal battle pass.

Characters

Tank heroes
Tank characters broadly have a high number of hit points and often have some type of shielding to withstand damage, but tend to have lower range than the other roles and either tend to lack mobility or offensive strength.

D.Va

D.Va, real name Hana Song, is a South Korean mecha pilot and former pro gamer from Busan. She pilots a combat mecha armed with twin Fusion Cannons, shotgun-like weapons that require no ammunition or reload time. Her mecha is equipped with rocket Boosters for short bursts of flight, as well as a Defense Matrix that allows it to destroy enemy projectiles in the air. She can also fire a volley of Micro-Missiles that do splash damage on impact. D.Va's ultimate ability, Self-Destruct, overloads and detonates her mecha, dealing massive damage to all enemies in a huge radius within line of sight. If her mech is destroyed (either by her ultimate or in combat), she ejects and continues to fight on foot, armed with a mid-range Light Gun, until her mecha can be summoned again.

To protect its cities against a massive omnic that rose from the East China Sea, the South Korean army developed automated battle mechs, deployed in a task force named MEKA (Mobile Exo-force of the Korean Army). As the omnic learned from its battles with the South Korean military, it disrupted the mechs' drone-control abilities, forcing the army to turn to human pilots. They elected to recruit professional gamers, who they believed possessed the necessary skills to pilot their mechs. Hana Song was the reigning StarCraft II world champion at the time, with a reputation for playing to win at all costs and showing no mercy to her opponents. She has since become a global icon, streaming footage of her combat missions.

D.Va was the fifth Overwatch hero added to Heroes of the Storm, released in May 2017 shortly after the game's version 2.0 update.

D.Va is voiced by Charlet Chung.

Doomfist

Doomfist is both the name of the titular cybernetic gauntlet and the title of its wielder, currently the Nigerian-born Akande Ogundimu, businessman and mixed martial artist turned mercenary. As originally released in Overwatch, Doomfist was classified as a Damage hero, but was reworked to become a Tank role in Overwatch 2, giving him more health and damage resistance. In his original skill kit, he had a short-range Hand Cannon on his off-hand that fires shotgun-like bursts and regenerates ammo over time, but most of his abilities came through melee attacks from the Doomfist Gauntlet. Doomfist can charge up a Rocket Punch that lets him lunge forward and punch an opponent backwards, a Seismic Slam that launches enemies in its range a short distance towards Doomfist, and a Rising Uppercut that greatly launches a single enemy while doing damage. Each ability that successfully hits also generates personal shielding for Doomfist (The Best Defense...). Doomfist's ultimate ability is named Meteor Strike, allowing him to jump into the air and slam the ground, damaging all enemies in a range around that point and pushing them back a short distance. Within Overwatch 2, Doomfist's Uppercut is replaced with a Power Block that absorbs frontal damage for a short time.

Doomfist is a generational character, the name and titular weapon passed between three people in the game's fiction. The current holder, Akande Ogundimu, was the heir to a cybernetics and prosthetics company with a love of competitive fighting, but he lost his right arm during the Omnic Crisis and although he got a replacement prosthesis, he was barred from competing. Looking for something to fill the void, he was approached by the previous holder of the Doomfist, Akinjide Adeyemi, to join the Talon terrorist group. Ogundimu agreed and thrived within its ranks, though he eventually grew dissatisfied with Adeyemi's monetary ambitions and killed him to take his weapon, mantle, and control of Talon. Though he was later caught by Overwatch and placed in prison, Talon broke him out, and Ogundimu seized his Doomfist gauntlet to reclaim the Doomfist name and retake his position within Talon.

The concept of the Doomfist has existed since the first cinematic trailer for Overwatch, with the heroes fighting for control of the gauntlet, and since has been teased as a potential playable character in other game updates. Doomfist was formally introduced as the 25th hero to Overwatch and was made available to play on all platforms on July 27, 2017.

Doomfist is voiced by Sahr Ngaujah.

Junker Queen
Junker Queen, real name Odessa "Dez" Stone,  is the new ruler of Junkertown, a ramshackle city in the Australian Outback. She also oversees the city's combat arena, the Scrapyard. Junker Queen's primary weapon is a hit scan shotgun. Passively, most of her attacks deal wound damage that drains enemy health over a short time while healing her. Her Commanding Shout buffs nearby allies with speed and regeneration for a short time. Her Jagged Blade ability lashes a throwing knife at a foe and can be recalled by her magnetic fist that can cause bleeding damage to an opponent. She can use her Carnage ability to strike with her ax in a heavy melee attack. Her Ultimate ability is Rampage, which wounds and debuffs all enemy players it reaches.

Her backstory is elaborated on in the animated short The Wastelander, revealing that she was banished from Junkertown as a child along with her family. Trained as a warrior to survive the wasteland, she returned to Junkertown thirteen years later to participate in "the Reckoning", a free-for-all combat to challenge the Junker King, Mason Howl, for control of Junkertown. The "free-for-all" turns out to be rigged, as the other two combatants, Geiger and Meri, are in Howl's service, though Odessa is able to turn them against him when she shows more concern for their lives than he does. With their aid, she defeats Howl, who pleads for mercy. She elects to show him the "same mercy" he showed her family and banishes him from the city, taking power as the Junker Queen. She opted to rule Junkertown in a more kind manner, helping the encampment to thrive while still overseeing the Scrapyard fights.

Prior to Overwatch 2, Junker Queen had been given a few voice lines and narrates the reveal video for the Junkertown map released in August 2017, and appears on posters around the map itself. She has shown animosity towards Junkrat and Roadhog, telling her guards to shoot the two on sight. While little else is known, the character quickly gained appeal in the Overwatch fandom, with some hoping she would be revealed as a playable hero in the future. Blizzard confirmed Junker Queen will be a playable character with the early access launch of Overwatch 2. Lead hero designer Geoff Goodman said that while they had toyed around with Junker Queen's abilities before, she was designed specifically for the launch of Overwatch 2 as an aggressive tank as to emphasis the faster gameplay in the sequel.

Junker Queen is voiced by Leah de Niese, except for her lines heard on the Junkertown map, where her voice is provided by Siho Ellsmore.

Orisa
Orisa is a four-legged centaur-like female Omnic built by 11-year-old robotics prodigy Efi Oladele, to be a "mechanical peacekeeper" of Numbani. Within her Overwatch skill kit, her primary weapon was the Fusion Driver, a long-range projectile-based machine gun; its alternate fire mode, Halt!, released a slow-moving projectile that the player could detonate to draw in nearby enemies towards the point of detonation, similar to Zarya's Graviton Surge. She could launch a deployable Protective Barrier similar to Reinhardt's shield which could be used for strategic defenses, and could Fortify herself to temporarily prevent all forms of crowd control against her, such as Lúcio's sonic blasts or Reinhardt's Earthshatter abilities. Her ultimate ability was Supercharger, a deployable device which gave Orisa and her teammates, provided they were in line-of-sight, an attack boost similar to that of Mercy, though the Supercharger itself could be destroyed by enemy fire and deactivated after a few seconds.

Orisa's skillkit was rebuilt significantly for Overwatch 2, meant to speed up play and reduce dependence on shields. Her Barrier, Halt, and Supercharger abilities have been removed, and instead she gained an Energy Javelin that can be used to launch enemies away, potentially damaging them if they hit walls. Orisa can also use her Javelin Spin to surge forward, directly attacking enemies and destroying projectiles. Her ultimate ability is Terra Surge that draws enemies towards her while making her immune to stun and crowd control effects. Additionally, her Fusion Driver fires large projectiles that shrink down as they travel.

Rebuilt from the wreckage of an OR15 defense robot after an attack by Doomfist in her home city of Numbani, Efi upgraded the hardware and software on the Omnic, emphasizing public safety as its primary objective. Efi's upgrades on the robot also created a sentient identity, in which Efi dubbed the robot Orisa from its designation number. Her name derives from "orisha", spirits in the Yoruba religion of West Africa.

Kaplan believed that Orisa would strategically play similar to Reinhardt as the "anchor" for an advancing team that allies would focus around. Besides being a second anchor tank beyond Reinhardt, Orisa's design came out of trying to push the boundaries of what they could do with a female character in the game, giving her the quadruped tank design and other features. They developed her personality to be somewhat between that of RoboCop and GLaDOS, with the veteran experience of the existing Omnics Zenyatta and Bastion. Because of these disparate elements, the design team came upon the idea of introducing Efi, so that the strange design of Orisa would be that of the Overwatch world as seen through the eyes of an imaginative child. Orisa became the centerpoint of a popular metagame strategy for the attacking team on Escort and Hybrid maps called "pirate ship", where her barrier, resembling the sails of a pirate ship, would be placed on the payload as it moved and protect one or more players also stationed on the payload, often typically Bastion or Torbjörn's turret, making it difficult for enemies to approach the payload from that side.

Orisa, the game's 24th hero, was revealed on March 2, 2017. Unlike the previously introduced hero, Sombra, which was the subject of a protracted alternate reality game that was met with some criticism, Blizzard opted to tease Orisa over a much shorter period via social media, introducing the character of Efi and new events in the Overwatch narrative happening on Numbani a few weeks before Orisa's reveal. Orisa was available on the Public Test Servers on the reveal, and was added to the game for all platforms on March 21, 2017, though her appearance in competitive mode was held off for one week as to give time for players to get used to the new character.

Orisa is voiced by Cherrelle Skeete.

Ramattra
Ramattra is an Omnic warrior-monk and the leader of Null Sector, an extremist group that resorts to violent means to achieve Omnic rights. Ramattra spends most of his time in his normal Omnic Form, using his Void Accelerator staff to fire projectiles at enemies and protecting his teammates with his projected Void Barrier. He can fire small spheres that when contacting the ground, create a Ravenous Vortex that draws enemies briefly into it and slows their movement. His Nemesis Form changes his attacks to Pummel, an onslaught of melee punches, as well as a secondary skill, Block, that reduces incoming damage, but requires Ramattra to hold still and unable to attack. The Nemesis form only lasts for eight seconds before Ramattra reverts to his normal Omnic form. Ramattra's ultimate is Annihilation, which converts Ramattra to his Nemesis form and send out a continuous beam of damaging nanobots, while blocking all incoming damage by half.

Ramattra is an R-7000 Ravager, a commando Omnic created by the "god program" Anubis during the Omnic Crisis; Ravagers became particularly hated by humans because of their actions during the war, and Ramattra is one of the few remaining. Seeking a purpose for himself beyond war, Ramattra joined the Shambali, an order of Omnic monks in the Himalayas, under the tutelage of Tekhartha Mondatta. It was during this time that he first met Zenyatta and introduced him to the teachings of the Shambali, considering him a brother. However, Ramattra broke with the Shambali because of humans' continued oppression against Omnics and Mondatta's insistence on peace with humans, and left on a crusade to liberate Omnics from human control. He became one of the founders of Null Sector, and planned out the King's Row uprising, which was defeated by Overwatch (played out in Uprising, one of Overwatchs Archive events). The failure of the uprising led Ramattra to more extreme measures; after the surviving leaders abandoned him, he began to forge Null Sector into an army to liberate all Omnics, whether they wished to be freed or not.

He was briefly introduced during the 2022 Overwatch League playoffs. Prior to his announcement, Ramattra also first appeared in the story-based game mode "Storm Rising", where he is offered an alliance with Talon by Doomfist. He was released in Overwatch 2 on December 6th, 2022 along with the second season of the game.

Ramattra is voiced by Ramon Tikaram.

Reinhardt
Reinhardt Wilhelm is a German soldier and adventurer, and one of the founding members of Overwatch. He wears a heavy suit of Crusader power armor, and carries a rocket-powered war hammer (Rocket Hammer) as his primary weapon. His main ability is a wide hard-light Barrier Field mounted on his arm that allows him to protect himself and teammates behind him from enemy fire. He may also launch a flaming projectile that ignores enemy barriers (Fire Strike), or use a rocket booster to Charge into the enemy lines, crushing them against walls. His ultimate ability, Earthshatter, makes him slam his hammer against the ground, sending out a shockwave that incapacitates enemies in front of him.

Reinhardt Wilhelm is a decorated Bundeswehr veteran from Stuttgart who lives under a knightly code of chivalry. He served as lieutenant to Colonel Balderich von Adler, commander of the Crusaders, which served alongside the regular army to act as their shield. Reckless in his younger years, Reinhardt often left his comrades behind to find glory in battle. That would change during the battle of Eichenwalde, where he lost his left eye to the blade of an OR14 assault omnic: Retreating into Eichenwalde Castle, Balderich gave Reinhardt his Overwatch initiation medal and sent him to rejoin the others, admonishing him to "be their shield". Becoming the only Crusader to survive the battle, Reinhardt remained in Overwatch service well into his fifties, his code of ethics and his blunt honesty making him a respected member of the team, until he was forced to retire due to his age and left to watch as Overwatch collapsed. When Winston issued the call to arms to his Overwatch comrades, Reinhardt - living in the ruins of Eichenwalde - answered without hesitation, despite the belief of his friend Brigitte that Overwatch had tossed him aside due to his age.

Reinhardt had started as one of the characters in the cancelled Titan game, as the "Juggernaut" character. When Titan was cancelled and the Blizzard team were looking for assets, they redesigned the Juggernaut into the Reinhardt character. Between Titan and Overwatch, Reinhardt had gone through eight major redesigns, with the version of Reinhardt in Overwatch having an "08" on one of his shoulder pieces to reflect these revisions. In the redesign for Overwatch 2, Reinhardt had gone through another small revision, and will now have "09" on his shoulder piece. Reinhardt was the most popular tank character during the game's open beta.

Reinhardt is voiced by Darin De Paul.

Roadhog
Roadhog, real name Mako Rutledge, is Junkrat's Australian enforcer and bodyguard. He wields a Scrap Gun that fires shrapnel in a mid-range automatic firing mode, or a short-range shotgun-like single shot. He also carries a NOS canister filled with "Hogdrogen" to self-heal (Take a Breather), and employs a Chain Hook to pull distant opponents towards him. His ultimate ability, Whole Hog, allows him to put a top loader into his scrap gun, firing it in full auto mode with increased knockback, wider spread, and no need to reload.

Mako Rutledge lived in the Australian Outback in the period after the Omnic Crisis. The government of Australia, in an effort to make peace with the omnics, allowed them to take possession of the omnium and the territory around it, displacing the human residents. Mako and other angry humans formed the Australian Liberation Front to strike against the omnium and the omnics that resided around it. In the end, the ALF overloaded the fusion core, destroying the omnium and turning the Outback into a radioactive wasteland, severely disfiguring Mako's face. Mako donned a mask and took to the broken highways on his chopper, forsaking his humanity little by little until he became a ruthless killer. He has since joined up with Junkrat as his bodyguard, in exchange for half of whatever treasure the ex-Junker knows the location of.

Roadhog is voiced by Josh Petersdorf.

Sigma
Sigma, real name Siebren de Kuiper, is a Dutch astrophysicist associated with Talon. His main weapons are Hyperspheres, gravitic projectiles that can bounce off walls and damage a small area that draw foes into the explosion, and Accretion, which gathers debris into a large projectile to kinetically throw at opponents, causing knockback. He also has two defensive abilities: Experimental Barrier, a barrier that he can deployed outward in front of him to a variable distance and then recall it, upon which it starts regenerating any damage taken; and Kinetic Grasp, which creates a field that absorbs projectiles that hit it which, upon release, coverts that into temporary shields for the character. His ultimate, Gravitic Flux, allows him to fly up briefly to place a black hole on the ground. Any opponents trapped within the range of the hole are thrown up into the air for several seconds before being slammed to the ground, taking half of their maximum health on impact.

De Kuiper was a pioneering figure in his field and conducted most of his research at his laboratory in The Hague. He established a foundation for his work to where he moved onto performing further experiments aboard an international space station. However, an experiment went wrong, briefly creating a black hole that touched De Kuiper. De Kuiper sustained psychological damage from this, and strange gravitational fluctuations persisted around him. Returned to Earth, he was deemed too dangerous to release, and kept in a secret government facility for years, where he became known only as "Subject Sigma". De Kuiper retreated into his own mind, believing he would never see the outside world again. However, the Talon organization discovered his existence, and freed him from the facility, hoping to use his gravitational powers to their own end. Talon helped Sigma to regain his sanity and control of the gravitational fluctuations to use as weapons, though Sigma remained unaware that Talon was manipulating him for their own purposes.

The skill kit for Sigma was designed to create another slow-moving anchor tank, similar to Reinhardt and Orisa, which the team would focus around; at the same time, they worked to develop this kit to avoid too much overlap with Zarya, particularly with her ultimate Graviton Surge skill. The team also knew they wanted to make this tank character related to Talon, establishing the basics of the hero concept early on. However, following the addition of Baptiste as Hero 30, Blizzard had anticipated the next hero would be Mauga, a character introduced in Baptiste's origin story, "What You Left Behind". Blizzard wanted to introduce Baptiste and Mauga back-to-back. However, as they neared release, Blizzard found that the kit did not make sense for the personality they had given Mauga. Rather than revamp the kit, they decided to develop a new character that would be better suited for the kit, holding off on Mauga's release as a hero for a later time. Blizzard quickly focused on an astrophysicist, which would readily tie into the gravity-based kit, and then adjusted the kit to incorporate additional gravitational powers that fell in line with the new character while further distinguishing his kit from Zarya's. They subsequently gave Sigma a tragic backstory as a villain who is unaware he was being used as a tool and as a weapon of mass destruction within Talon; whereas Baptiste had been in the same situation, Baptiste had the mental stability to walk away, while Sigma's ongoing dementia kept him working for Talon. On his reveal, Sigma was revealed to levitate slightly throughout the ground, and to that end, is barefoot, which drew some reaction from fans. Blizzard artist Qiu Fang explained this decision came from real-world mental health hospitals, where patients are often not given any shoes for which they potentially use to harm themselves. As such, leaving Sigma barefoot was to "sell the asylum look".

Following a few teasers on social media in the week prior, Sigma was formally announced as the game's 31st hero on July 22, 2019, and made available on the PTR the following day. Sigma was added across all servers on August 13, 2019. He is voiced by Boris Hiestand.

Winston

Winston is a genetically engineered gorilla, scientist, and adventurer. He wields a short-range Tesla Cannon that electrocutes enemies at close range, and wears armor that incorporates a Jump Pack, allowing him to make leaps across great distances and damage foes on landing. He can also deploy a Barrier Projector that provides a temporary spherical barrier to protect himself and teammates from enemy fire. Winston's ultimate ability is Primal Rage, in which he briefly gives in to "the beast within" to get massively increased health and powerful melee attacks with knockback, although he foregoes his primary weapon.

Winston was among a group of genetically enhanced gorillas living at the Horizon Lunar Colony, a research base on the Moon, intended to test the effects of prolonged habitation in space. He took his name from his mentor and caretaker, Dr. Harold Winston, the colony's chief scientist, from whom he also gained his signature glasses. When the other gorillas rose up, killed the human scientists, and took over the colony, Winston escaped to Earth in a rocket he built himself. He later joined up with Overwatch, offering his scientific expertise to the team (such as building Tracer's chronal accelerator). When Overwatch disbanded, Winston went into seclusion at an old Overwatch base in Gibraltar.

Winston appears in the intro cinematic, as well as the animated short Recall. The short recalls how he gained his glasses from Dr. Harold Winston, as well as fending off Reaper and agents of Talon who attempt to hack his database of Overwatch agents.

Winston is voiced by Crispin Freeman.

Wrecking Ball 

Wrecking Ball is the ring name for Hammond, a super-intelligent hamster mechanic and adventurer, who competes in battles piloting a large spherical mech suit with two forms: a quadrupedal form used for firing his Quad Cannons, his main attack, and a nearly perfectly spherical form which gives him the ability to Roll around the battlefield but without any primary attack. He can engage a temporary Adaptive Shield that increases in strength with the more enemies that are nearby. He can use a Grappling Claw to attach to a surface, switching the mech to its Roll form, and which he can then swing around, gaining momentum and damaging enemies in his path, and release at any time. He can execute a Piledriver that slams his mech into the ground, damaging and launching nearby enemies into the air. Hammond's ultimate is Minefield, which deploys a number of proximity mines around him that damage opponents.

Hammond, previously known as "Specimen 8", had been among the genetically engineered animals who resided at the Horizon facility on the Moon when the gorillas led an uprising against the human scientists. Having displayed an ability to regularly escape from his enclosure, as well as a self-taught aptitude for mechanics, Hammond constructed a capsule attached to the scratch-built rocket built by Winston, and hitched a ride with him when Winston escaped to Earth. His capsule separated from Winston's rocket and landed in the Australian Outback, where he modified the capsule into a combat mech to fight in the Scrapyard arena in Junkertown, earning him the nickname "Wrecking Ball". With his winnings, he upgraded the mech further to escape from the Outback and travel the world.

Hammond's first mention in-game was in the "Horizon Lunar Colony" map added in May 2017. Further, with gameplay changes made to the Horizon map released onto the PTR in May 2018, a new room previously blocked had been opened, showing Hammond secretly coordinating his escape from the colony alongside Winston's own plans. The Blizzard Overwatch social media accounts also began teasing a new hero starting in late June 2018. He was formally announced as the game's 28th hero on June 28, 2018, as well as being playable on the PTR that day. He was added to the full game roster on July 24, 2018.

Hammond does not speak, as Kaplan said "that would be completely ridiculous", but his animal noises are voiced by Dee Bradley Baker, while his mech's computer, voiced by Jonathan Lipow, translates the squeaks to understandable words.

Zarya

Zarya, full name Aleksandra Zaryanova, is a Russian powerlifter and soldier. She is armed with a Particle Cannon that can either emit a continuous beam of energy or launch an energy projectile in an arc. She is also able to project a personal Particle Barrier onto herself or onto one of her teammates (Projected Barrier), and soaking up damage with these barriers raises the power of her own attacks proportionally. Zarya's ultimate ability, Graviton Surge, forms a gravity well that pulls enemies in and damages them, leaving them open to other attacks.

In her fictional backstory, Aleksandra Zaryanova's village in Siberia was on the front lines of the Omnic Crisis, which devastated the region. As she grew older, she swore to gain the strength to protect her people and homeland. She became a bodybuilder and weightlifter, expected to break a number of records in the world championships, but the dormant omnium in Siberia awakened on the eve of the tournament, and she withdrew from the competition to join the local defense forces.

Zarya was initially conceived of by artist Arnold Tsang after watching a weightlifting competition. He recognized that the body shape of weightlifters was non-standard but would make for a great, tough female hero.

Zarya was the second Overwatch hero added to Heroes of the Storm.

Zarya is voiced by Dolya Gavanski.

Damage heroes
Damage heroes are those that have the largest capacity to deal damage to enemy players, and tend to be able to move quickly around the map. However, they can be more vulnerable to attacks from the other team with lower hit points than other roles.

Ashe
Ashe, full name Elizabeth Caledonia "Calamity" Ashe, is an American gunslinger and leader of the Deadlock Gang, a band of arms-trafficking outlaws based in Arizona. Her main weapon is The Viper, a lever action repeating rifle that can be used for short-ranged quick fire or sighted long shots. She also carries a Coach gun which can knock enemies back and propel her up or away from obstacles as well as enable limited rocket jumping, and can throw Dynamite bundles that detonate after a short delay or immediately when shot with her rifle, setting opponents on fire. Her ultimate ability summons B.O.B., her Omnic butler/bodyguard, who charges forward to knock enemies into the air before laying down suppressive fire with his built-in arm cannons. Unlike deployable assets from other heroes, such as Torbjörn's turrets, B.O.B. serves as a temporary seventh player on the team until his health is exhausted, and thus is able to capture or challenge objectives, and can be healed by allies.
 
Born into a wealthy family with connections to the world's top CEOs, Ashe was largely neglected by her parents and left in the care of their omnic butler, B.O.B. She was regularly involved in fights at school, and also in petty crime. It was a chance meeting with a local ruffian named Cole Cassidy (going by the name "Jesse McCree" at the time), a string of crimes they committed together, and a desire to make her own "family" that led her to embrace the path of the outlaw, and she was one of the four original founders of the Deadlock Gang. Spurred by Ashe's increasingly larger heists, the Deadlock Gang's quick rise to prominence resulted in violent conflicts with the other criminal organizations in the American Southwest. After years of fighting, Ashe summoned the heads of the other major groups and used her business acumen, learned from her mostly-absent parents, to convince them that they could work better, if not together, then at least not against one another, so long as they kept their word, did not work with law enforcement, respected one another's territory, and punished any sort of betrayal. No longer having to focus on squabbles with other gangs, Ashe continued to build on her reputation, earning her a place at the top of the authorities' most wanted lists.

Blizzard considered Ashe a "unicorn" character in that her route from conception to implementation was straightforward, a rarity from their past experience. They wanted to create a female gunslinger, but needed to differentiate her from either Cassidy or Reaper, and some initial designs felt too goth-like. They settled on a mix of a biker and a cowboy. A similar streamlined experience was found with B.O.B., having been already drawn into the storyboard for the animated short "Reunion" and became an internal favorite to bring into the game, and only required translating his design into the game. One difficulty faced by the team was how to implement and optimize B.O.B., since he is treated as another teammate while on the field, impacting the game's memory and performance.

Ashe was introduced as the 29th hero in the animated short Reunion, shown at BlizzCon on November 2, 2018, and was available to play on the PTR on November 5. She was added to the main game for all players on November 13, 2018, and to competitive play on November 27, 2018. She is voiced by veteran voice actress Jennifer Hale.

Bastion
Bastion is a combat robot-turned-explorer. In Overwatch, it could Reconfigure between a mobile form outfitted with a submachine gun (Configuration: Recon) and a stationary form equipped with a Gatling gun (Configuration: Sentry). It also had the ability to Self-Repair and quickly regain lost health, and its Ironclad passive reduced damage taken. Its ultimate ability was Configuration: Tank, which allowed it to roll on treads and fire explosive rounds from a smooth-bore cannon for a short period of time. Bastion underwent a major rework for Overwatch 2, losing the Tank reconfiguration in favor of an artillery form that can bomb three locations on the current map. It lost the Self-Repair ability, instead gaining the ability to launch grenades as alternative fire. Its sentry form is now mobile, with a main gun that has more range and less spread, but it is also a temporary transformation with a cooldown.

Bastion is a SST Laboratories Siege Automaton E54, a battle automaton originally designed for peacekeeping purposes; during the Omnic Crisis, they were deployed against their human makers becoming a symbol of the horrors of the war. Bastion was severely damaged in the field near the German village of Eichenwalde in the Black Forest during the final days of the war, and was left dormant and exposed to the elements. For more than a decade, it became overgrown with plant life and the nests of small animals, until it unexpectedly reactivated. It had developed a fascination with nature, but its combat programming still took over whenever it encountered anything it perceived as a threat. Due to conflicts with fearful humans, Bastion largely avoids populated areas in favor of exploring the wild. It is usually accompanied by a small bird named Ganymede, who was building a nest on it when it reactivated, and both humanizes Bastion and makes it relatable.

Bastion is the focus of the animated short The Last Bastion, showing the moments when Ganymede inadvertently reactivated it. Bastion was also the first character to be made available in Lego form through official collaboration between Blizzard and The Lego Group. A limited-time event in 2019 allowed players the opportunity to earn a Bastion skin based on the Lego version.

Bastion is voiced by Chris Metzen.

Cassidy
Cole Cassidy is an American bounty hunter and vigilante with a cybernetic arm and a Wild West motif. He carries his Peacekeeper six-shooter, with its primary fire that can shoot single shots with high accuracy at moderate range, and its alternate fire allowing him to Fan the Hammer to quickly unload any remaining ammo at close range in rapid fire with some loss of accuracy. He can quickly dodge attacks using his Combat Roll ability which also instantly reloads his revolver. In Overwatch he could throw a Flashbang grenade a short distance which stunned enemies and interrupted their abilities. In Overwatch 2, the Flashbang ability was replaced with a short-range Magnetic Grenade that deals high damage on a direct hit, but no longer stuns the enemy. Cassidy's ultimate ability is Deadeye, which allows him to line up shots on every enemy in his sight, with resulting damage proportional to the time spent aiming. In Overwatch, Cassidy was considered one of the easiest characters to learn, enabled by the Flashbang/Fan the Hammer combo which could kill most low- to mid-health opponents in one shot.

In the Overwatch narrative, Cassidy came from Santa Fe, New Mexico. At some point in his early life, he assumed the pseudonym of "Jesse McCree" to hide from his past, and joined the Deadlock Gang, a group of traffickers in military hardware operating in the American Southwest. He and his fellows were captured in an Overwatch sting operation, and he was given a choice: prison, or serving in Blackwatch, the black ops division of Overwatch. He chose the latter, believing he could make amends for his past crimes, and reveling in the lack of bureaucratic oversight. When Overwatch began to collapse and Blackwatch sought to reform it to its own ends, Cassidy went underground, resurfacing years later as a gunslinger for hire, dropping his false name.

Cassidy was one of the few characters developed for the game based on a stereotype, often compared to the Man with No Name, but they developed his character and narratives to embrace that stereotype. The visual appearance of Cassidy came about based on a StarCraft tie-in game that the Overwatch team, following the cancellation of Titan, has considered before settling on Overwatch. Blizzard wanted Cassidy to be a hero strong against agile opponents and to counter close-range abilities, according to Geoff Goodman. To achieve this, Cassidy has seen a confusing sequence of buffs and nerfs in the months after the game's initial release, which led some to jokingly call him "the most indecisive character" of the game. Initially, his burst damage output and versatility on all ranges made him a popular pick in almost any situation, but after numerous tweaks, he lost his main role of a tank killer and became a somewhat ambiguous anti-flanker with additional long-range capability. When these updates were made, Kaplan said that they were necessary to bring more in line with their vision for Cassidy's role, saying that "We want [Cassidy] to be a counter to people like Tracer, Genji and Reaper. What we're not crazy about, right now, is the way in which [Cassidy] can absolutely shred tanks."

The character was originally named Jesse McCree when Overwatch first launched, named after former Blizzard staff member Jesse McCree. In the wake of the July 2021 lawsuit filed by California's Department of Fair Employment against Activision Blizzard related to workplace misconduct and discrimination against female employees, Jesse McCree was confirmed to be no longer working for the company after he had been connected to some of the alleged behavior. In the weeks that followed, during Overwatch League broadcasts, announcers opted to use "the cowboy" instead of "McCree" when calling matches. Blizzard confirmed in late August 2021 that they will rename McCree "to something that better represents what Overwatch stands for", though will need to review their narrative state before deciding on a new name, as well as alternating plans for release content to make this change. Blizzard announced that with an October 2021 patch, the McCree name would be removed and replaced with Cassidy. Blizzard stated "We know that actions speak louder than words, and we hope to show you our commitment to making Overwatch a better experience in-game and continue to make our team the best it can be." One of Overwatch character-specific events had been planned for McCree but was pushed back at the onset of legal action, and later ran as "Cole Cassidy's New Blood Challenge" in November 2021, featuring a new digital comic that spoke to Cassidy finding a new identity for himself.

Cassidy is voiced by Matthew Mercer.

Echo
Echo is a female Omnic created by Dr. Mina Liao after the Omnic Crisis. Her primary attack is a Tri-Shot that is a set of three projectiles at a time, and she can fire a Sticky Bomb that does initial damage on striking a target and then after a short time explodes that does damage in a small area. She also has a Focusing Beam that damages a target in the beam, with damage intensified for targets that are below half-health, including barriers. She also has a Flight ability that can launch her into the air, and her Glide passive ability allows her to hover and descend at a controlled rate with good horizontal control. Her ultimate ability is Duplicate, which allows Echo to take the appearance and ability of any Hero on the opposing team (save for Echo) for 15 seconds, with an accelerated ultimate gain rate.

Dr. Liao was one of the scientists that had created the Omnics while part of the Omnica Corporation, and who had joined the newly-found Overwatch to deal with the Omnic Crisis. She had created Echo as part of the Echo Project as a more benevolent artificial intelligence to try to overcome her guilt for creating the more harmful Omnics, hoping that AI could be used to save humanity. An attack on Overwatch headquarters killed Dr. Liao. Echo took on part of Dr. Liao's personality, and thus became "her promise, her legacy, her Echo".

Echo was the 32nd Hero to be introduced to Overwatch in March 2020. She started as a planned character for Titan, though initially was more functional and less human-like, with her more human appearance coming about by the fourth iteration of her design. Her design had always been very light and elegant, so she was envisioned to be a support character at the start. But once they established the character's name as Echo, implying what her abilities may be including her Duplicate ultimate, this made the choice of a support role a poor one, as during the use of Duplicate her teammates would not have her normal support abilities. By making her a damage hero, this did not interfere with the team's support roles, nor overlapped extensively with Pharah, an existing flying hero who does not have as significant control over her flying movements as Echo.

Prior to her announcement, Echo had also appeared in the animated short Reunion, released alongside Ashe's reveal as the 29th hero. Ashe attempts to steal her while she is in a state of hibernation, but she is rescued by Cassidy. When reactivated, Cassidy informs her of Winston's recall of Overwatch agents. She was also shown in the teaser cinematic for Overwatch 2, joining Winston's recall of other Overwatch members to fight new threats. At the time of the Overwatch 2 reveal, Kaplan stated Blizzard planned to introduce Echo as a playable hero at some point in the future. Echo was announced on March 18, 2020, available to players on the PTR the following day, and unlocked for all players on April 14, 2020. Kaplan anticipated that Echo would be the last character to be added to Overwatch roster until the release of Overwatch 2.

Echo is voiced by Jeannie Bolet.

Genji
Genji Shimada is a Japanese cyborg ninja. His main attack method is to throw three Shurikens, either in quick succession or simultaneously in a horizontal spread. His abilities are Swift Strike, a quick dashing lunge with good range, and Deflect, a defensive stance that briefly ricochets projectiles back at enemies with his wakizashi. His Cyber-Agility allows him to double-jump and run up walls. Genji's ultimate ability is Dragonblade, during which Genji unsheathes the odachi on his back and delivers powerful, sweeping melee attacks to any targets within reach for a limited amount of time.

In his origin story, Genji transforms from a slacker to a superhero. His family—the Japanese Shimada crime family—ordered his eldest brother Hanzo to kill Genji for his selfish and hedonistic behavior (as shown in the short Dragons and referenced in-game on the Hanamura map by a shrine devoted to Genji). Before he could die, Overwatch found him, and their chief doctor Mercy restored Genji as a cyborg. After quelling the rogue artificial intelligence in the first Omnic Crisis, Genji left the Overwatch team to find peace with his new body, mentored by the Omnic Shambali monk Zenyatta. When Winston reactivates Overwatch years after the first Omnic Crisis, Genji is one of the first to return. He later appeared in Hanamura Showdown, a non-canon cinematic trailer for Heroes of the Storm 2.0. Genji also appeared in the animated short Zero Hour, which functioned as announcement cinematic for Overwatch 2.

Originally, Genji and his brother Hanzo were designed as one character. However, Blizzard Entertainment thought this arrow-firing, shuriken-tossing, and katana-wielding character was too complex, therefore splitting it into two different characters. Hanzo kept the name of the original character, as well as the general aesthetic of that character. The story and relationship between the two brothers were inspired by a documentary film titled Jiro Dreams of Sushi, in which the older brother had to inherit the restaurant and carry on his father's legacy, while the younger brother had more free will.
Gameplay-wise, Genji is a flanker and an infiltrator optimized for one-on-one fights. Genji's Deflect ability can counter many enemy ultimate abilities. While some characters function best when paired with specific teammates, Genji works best in isolation. Genji is strong against turrets like Bastion and those of Torbjörn, and is effective at flanking snipers. Genji is vulnerable against characters with energy weapons that bypass his deflection, such as Symmetra, Winston, and Zarya. Genji's agile, melee-oriented playstyle is said to be difficult to learn, yet is popular among new players who like his ninja design.

A vocal minority of players began to complain about Genji's balance with other characters in August 2016, as team strategies came to be centered around his rediscovered abilities when the abilities of other offensive characters were reduced. Later that month, Blizzard rebalanced Genji by reducing the power of his abilities. At the end of 2016, Blizzard offered a special "oni" character skin as a promotion for players who also played the company's multiplayer online battle arena game Heroes of the Storm. Genji was added as one of the heroes in Heroes of the Storm on April 25, 2017.

Genji is voiced by Gaku Space.

Hanzo

Hanzo Shimada is a Japanese archer, assassin and mercenary. He wields the Storm Bow and is equipped with specialized arrows, including Sonic Arrows to detect enemies and Storm Arrows to fire five weaker shots in rapid succession. He is also able to Wall Climb, enabling him to reach vantage points, and Lunge forward while in mid-air. His ultimate ability is Dragonstrike, in which he unleashes a spiraling spirit dragon that can travel through obstacles to deal damage in a straight line.

Hanzo is the elder brother of Genji, and the heir to the head of the Shimada clan. He was trained from an early age to take over the clan, becoming a skilled warrior and marksman, as well as a strategist. When his father died, Hanzo was directed by the clan elders to bring Genji into line; and when Genji refused, the two brothers battled, resulting in what appeared to be Genji's death. Guilty and grief-stricken, Hanzo abandoned the clan and traveled the world in an effort to restore his honor.

Hanzo is the focus of the animated short Dragons, where he visits his family's castle on the anniversary of his duel with Genji, leaving offerings at the castle shrine to honor Genji's memory.

Originally, Hanzo had an ability called Scatter Arrows, an arrow that split into multiple arrows that could ricochet off the environment and hit targets around corners. Players grew to find this ability cheap since it, if well-placed, could take out even Tank characters with a single shot. Blizzard addressed this with a rework update that replaced the ability with the above Storm Arrows and Lunge abilities, which went live in May 2018.

Hanzo appears as a playable hero in Heroes of the Storm.

Hanzo is voiced by Paul Nakauchi.

Junkrat
Junkrat, real name Jamison Fawkes, is an Australian scavenger, mercenary and anarchist. He carries a Frag Launcher that fires grenades and employs Steel Traps and remote-detonated Concussion Mines; when he is killed, several primed grenades are released from his body in a final attempt to get back at the attacker (Total Mayhem). Junkrat's ultimate ability is RIP-Tire, a self-propelled truck wheel loaded with explosives that he's able to manually steer and detonate. Junkrat was developed by Blizzard to balance out against Torbjorn's turrets.

After the Omnic Crisis, an "omnium" – an A.I. controller that directs omnics as part of a hive mind – was destroyed in the Outback, turning it into an irradiated wasteland. Living in the ruins are the Junkers, a group of scavengers and mercenaries; Jamison Fawkes was among their numbers. The effects of the radiation awakened a sense of madness which soon developed into pyromania. In the heart of the destroyed omnium, Junkrat found a valuable secret, making him the target of bounty hunters and rival gangs. He made a deal with the Junker enforcer Roadhog, who agreed to become his personal bodyguard in return for a 50-50 share of the profits from their finds. His loud personality often drives him into trouble, one of them is by blowing away their deception when attempting a Trojan-horse plan to get revenge on the Queen of Junkertown after banishing him and Roadhog from her dominion.

Junkrat appears as a playable hero in Heroes of the Storm.

Junkrat is voiced by Chris Parson.

Mei

Mei, full name Mei-Ling Zhou, is a Chinese climatologist and adventurer from Xi'an. She wields an Endothermic Blaster that can either freeze enemies in place with a short-range spray or shoot a long-range icicle projectile, and she can also use it to Cryo-Freeze herself in a solid ice block to shield herself from damage and heal injuries, as well as erect Ice Walls with many versatile uses, primarily for blocking the enemies. Her ultimate ability is Blizzard, which calls down Snowball, her personal weather modification drone, to freeze all enemies in a wide radius.

Mei was employed by Overwatch to help discover the cause for the planet's changing climate, which had been variously blamed on industry, the increasing Omnic population, and increased consumption of natural resources. While deployed at an Overwatch research base in Antarctica, Mei and the other scientists there were trapped by a polar storm that damaged the facility. Lacking sufficient resources to wait for a rescue, they decided to enter cryostasis. But the pods malfunctioned, and Mei was the only survivor when she was found close to a decade later; by that time, Overwatch had disbanded, and all of the bases set up to monitor the climate crisis had stopped functioning. Mei elected to carry on the work alone, accompanied by Snowball. As she restores the base's communication system, she hears Winston's recall for Overwatch, and sets off with Snowball to make her way back to society, joining Winston and Tracer on the first mission to fight the Null Sector off in Paris.

Mei is the focus of the animated short Rise and Shine, showing the moments after she awakened from cryostasis and had to find a way to call for help. She was added as a playable hero in Heroes of the Storm in June 2020.

Mei is voiced by Yu "Elise" Zhang.

Pharah

Pharah, real name Fareeha Amari, is an Egyptian security officer. She wears the Raptora Mark VI, a jetpack-equipped combat suit, and wields a Rocket Launcher as her primary weapon. She has a Wedjat (Eye of Horus) tattoo around her right eye. Her abilities are Concussive Blast, a rocket with powerful knockback but no damage, and Jump Jets, a quick jetpack-assisted vertical ascension comparable to a rocket jump. Her passive ability allows her to Hover in the air, which is paired well with her Jump Jets ability. Pharah's ultimate ability is Barrage, where she fires a continuous stream of small air-to-ground rockets at targets, while she is frozen still in place.

Fareeha Amari is the daughter of Ana Amari, one of the founding members of Overwatch. She served as an officer in the Egyptian Army and aspired to follow in her mother's footsteps, but Overwatch was disbanded before she could join its ranks. After leaving the army, Pharah took a job with Helix Security International, a private security firm contracted to protect an artificial intelligence facility below the Giza Plateau.

Pharah is a solid attacker able to consistently maintain pressure on the enemy team. Her rocket launcher allows her to hold chokepoints or lay out suppressive fire onto objectives both in offense and defense, and her vertical agility renders her out of reach for characters reliant on close-range fighting. Her Concussion Blast disrupts enemy formations, and in the hands of a skilled player it can be used to score environmental kills. Pharah is a good match with Mercy, whose Guardian Angel ability allows both of them to fly alongside each other; this tactic is often called "Pharmercy". Pharah is vulnerable against long-range oriented characters, especially those wielding hitscan weapons, such as Widowmaker or Cassidy.

Pharah is voiced by Jen Cohn.

Reaper
Reaper, real name Gabriel Reyes, is an American mercenary and terrorist, originally a founding member of Overwatch, now a leading member of Talon. He is attired in a black hooded trenchcoat with a white skull mask and wields twin Hellfire Shotguns. His abilities are Shadow Step, a medium-range line of sight teleport, and Wraith Form, a brief period of invincibility and speed increase. He was able to heal himself by consuming the souls of fallen enemies, visible as red burning "Soul Globes" on the ground but later was changed to a passive ability called The Reaping which allows him to steal a 30% heal from the damage he deals. Reaper's ultimate ability is Death Blossom, a twin shotgun gun kata which deals massive damage in a short radius around him.

Born in Los Angeles, Gabriel Reyes was a veteran officer of the United States Armed Forces who was subjected to a "soldier enhancement program", where he and the other selectees were genetically enhanced to become "perfect soldiers"; Reyes became known as "Soldier: 24". When the United Nations formed Overwatch to combat the Omnic Crisis, Reyes was one of the two men from the program on the shortlist to join up and was initially tapped to lead it. However, he was passed over in favor of his friend Jack Morrison, causing a rift between the two men. Reyes was later named commander of Blackwatch, Overwatch's black ops division, but his jealousy of Morrison (due to Morrison's publicity as the official leader of Overwatch, versus Reyes' secret dealings with Blackwatch) eventually caused Reyes to reveal Blackwatch's existence to the public by murdering a mobster that he was ordered to arrest. This destroyed both organizations and resulted in a battle that destroyed their headquarters in Switzerland. Both men were believed dead, but in reality survived, although Reyes's cells are now simultaneously decaying and regenerating, causing his body to fall apart and rebuild itself over and over again.

Reyes resurfaced years later as "the Reaper", a mysterious mercenary responsible for terrorist attacks all around the world, having been consumed by his hunger for fame to the point that he no longer cared what he was known for. Through the efforts of rogue geneticist and former Blackwatch member Moira O'Deorain, he has developed the ability to steal life essence from his enemies, and also become incorporeal to avoid harm. His true identity is unknown to the rest of the world, as are his motivations, though a pattern of his movements indicates that he is hunting down former agents of Overwatch. He appears in the cinematic trailer, teamed with Widowmaker in a raid in the Overwatch Museum to steal Doomfist's gauntlet for Talon. He also appears in the animated short Recall, where he raids Winston's lab at Gibraltar to steal his list of Overwatch agents, though he was unsuccessful.

Reaper is a flanker/assassin type of character, able to teleport behind enemy lines and attack from the rear to single out targets of importance, before using Wraith Form to escape. The ability to heal from dealing damage helps him in taking out tanks, due to their large bodies and health pools making it easier for him to heal rapidly. Reaper is vulnerable while executing his Death Blossom, so proper usage of it relies heavily on the element on surprise, taking enemies out with its massive damage output before they get the chance to react.

Reaper is voiced by Keith Ferguson.

Soldier: 76

Soldier: 76, real name Jack Francis Morrison, is an American soldier-turned-vigilante and a founding member of Overwatch. He wears a facemask with a visor and carries an experimental Heavy Pulse Rifle equipped with an underbarrel launcher that fires three Helix Rockets. His abilities are Sprint, a forward run with no duration limit or cooldown, and Biotic Field, a deployable device which regenerates the health of allies in the immediate vicinity. His ultimate ability, Tactical Visor, puts up a head-up display that allows his rifle to automatically track enemies in his line of sight for a brief period.

Soldier: 76 was originally developed by Overwatchs creative director Chris Metzen in the early 2000s for a comic story used in Digital Webbing Presents #16, published in July 2004. In the "Bastet" short story released by Blizzard in January 2019, it is revealed that Soldier: 76 at one point had a relationship with a man named Vincent prior to fully investing his time into Overwatch, making him the second confirmed LGBT character of the Overwatch roster after Tracer.

Soldier: 76 was the most popular offense character during the game's open beta. He was conceived as a "gateway hero" to help players that are used to modern shooters ease into the game.

Soldier: 76 is voiced by Fred Tatasciore.

Sombra

Sombra, real name Olivia Colomar, is a Mexican hacker and infiltrator. She is equipped with a low-damage, high-capacity Machine Pistol for short range combat. Her trademark ability allows her to Hack enemies, turrets or neutral health kits. Hacked enemies cannot use their abilities, hacked turrets are disabled, and hacked health kits respawn faster and become unusable to the enemy team. Sombra also has Thermoptic Camo that gives her invisibility paired with a speed boost, and can throw down a Translocator beacon that she can later teleport to. Her passive ability, Opportunist, enables her to track enemies that are low on health, even through walls. Sombra's ultimate ability is EMP, an electromagnetic shockwave that hacks all enemies around her, as well as disabling their barriers and shields and displaying if they have fully charged ultimates.

In the Overwatch narrative, Sombra had been orphaned at an early age but quickly discovered her natural gift for hacking. She initially used it as part of the Los Muertos gang that fought against a corrupt Mexican government. Over the years her hacking expanded to other global corporations and powers, managing to keep her identity secret. She was eventually discovered by a mysterious organization that forced her into hiding, destroying all records of her existence. She augmented her body with cybernetic attachments to help her hack, and joined the criminal organization Talon to discover the identity of the organization that uncovered her.

Sombra was introduced into Overwatch through alternate reality game (ARG) starting as early as the game's open beta, as to give "an idea of who she is and a little bit of her personality before we even unveiled her", according to Blizzard's lead hero designer Geoff Goodman. Sombra is the focus of the animated short Infiltration, where she infiltrates the Volskaya Industries complex alongside Reaper and Widowmaker to assassinate the head executive.

Sombra is voiced by Carolina Ravassa.

Sojourn
Sojourn, real name Vivian Chase, is a Canadian soldier who serves as a captain within the Overwatch team. She has cybernetic implants in her head, as well as a cybernetic arm that transforms into a disruptor cannon. Her carried weapon is a prototype railgun, which she is able to handle the increased recoil of due to her cybernetics. Her primary weapon is a machine gun that build up energy over time, which then can be unleashed as a railgun shot through its secondary fire. She can launch an area-of-effect Disruptor Shot that traps and drains enemies while building her railgun energy. She can perform a Power Slide that can be used to finish into a high jump. Her Ultimate is Overclock which continually recharges her railgun and makes its shots piercing.

Prior to her introduction as a hero to arrive with Overwatch 2, she had only been seen through communication channels within the game, specifically serving as the mission commander for the "Storm Rising" co-operative event, or in the animated media, such as the short Recall. According to Kaplan, Sojourn had been a character in development for the game since Overwatchs inception around the same time as Wrecking Ball, around 2014, but did not say at the time whether she will be released as a playable character. According to lead hero designer Geoff Goodman, one difficulty they had in tuning Sojourn's kit was her railgun, as effectively it was similar in capabilities to Widowmaker's sniper rifle but without the cooldown making it overpowered, and eventually found a means to balance these factors. Sojourn was introduced as a playable hero with the first public beta of Overwatch 2 in April 2022. According to lore, Sojourn had worked with Overwatch commander Jack Morrison during the Omnic War, which led to her joining with Overwatch, where she either commanded agents or provided long-range cover for field teams.

Sojourn is voiced by Cherise Boothe.

Symmetra

Symmetra, real name Satya Vaswani, is an Indian architect. She wields a Photon Projector that emits a short-ranged beam that does more damage the longer it remains on an opponent. Her primary fire will charge her ammo instead of using it, making her a good counter to barriers. It can also be used to charge up and launch a slow-moving ball of energy in a straight line. She can fire up to three Sentry Turrets that attach to any surface they touch, and which damage opponents in close range. She has a Teleporter skill that allows her to place the entrance and exits points of a warp tunnel that has an infinite duration, through which teammates and certain projectiles and weapons can travel through, until the teleporter is recalled by Symmetra or destroyed by an enemy. Her ultimate ability is a Photon Barrier, a powerful energy barrier that blocks opponents' fire, and large enough to cut through the entire map.

The Vishkar Corporation, based in southern India, created hard light technology that allowed it to build cities, and trained its elite "architechs" - equal parts architect and engineer - to bend the hard light into any shape needed for that purpose; with this technology, they built the city of Utopaea to serve as their base. Satya Vaswani's potential was discovered at a young age, and she was taken from a life of poverty to train at Vishkar's architect academy in Utopaea. Becoming one of the top students in her class, she combined the light-bending technology with the traditional dances of her homeland. Given the name "Symmetra", Vishkar dispatched her on clandestine missions around the world to oversee their corporate interests. Kaplan also stated that Symmetra was on the autistic spectrum.

Symmetra initially was defined as a support character, and was one of the more infrequently-selected characters across all game modes during the game's first two years, due to her not being considered a fun character to play and maintaining her support abilities was considered "chore-like". Blizzard has been working to revitalize the character since launch, revamping her skill kit twice in December 2016 and later in July 2018 to make her more amenable for players. Prior abilities, since removed, include the ability to give each player individual shields as well as a ranged shield projector that served as her ultimate, and a teleporter ultimate that would appear between her current position and the current spawn room for her team allowing players to quickly return to battle. Her Photon Projector also used to automatically lock onto opponents and its alternative fire used to travel through barriers and players. The July 2018 rework moved Symmetra from a support to a damage hero, better reflecting her intended function in a team composition according to Blizzard.

Symmetra is voiced by Anjali Bhimani.

Torbjörn
Torbjörn Lindholm is a dwarfish Swedish engineer and weapons designer, and a founding member of Overwatch. His armor comes equipped with a mobile forge, and he carries a Rivet Gun that shoots molten slag and a Forge Hammer for construction and melee attacks. His Deploy Turret allows him to toss a turret a short distance away, which will then self-deploy before targeting and firing on any opponent in its sights. His Overload ability briefly increases his armor, and improves his speed and attack attributes for a short amount of time. His ultimate ability Molten Core allows him to shoot several globs of molten metal on the ground, which damages any opponent that stands in it.

Torbjörn believes that technology should serve a better vision for humanity, putting him at odds with his employers, who wanted to control the weapons with artificial intelligence. His deep-seated fear of sentient machines, dismissed at first as paranoia, became reality during the Omnic Crisis, during which he was recruited by Overwatch. His engineering knowledge proved invaluable to achieving Overwatch's aim of ending the Omnic Crisis. After Overwatch was disbanded, his weapons were stolen or stashed away, and Torbjörn has set out to ensure they are not used to harm the innocent.

While Torbjörn was not the first character created for Overwatch, his design, meant to bridge between Warcraft and Overwatch, became the baseline for nearly all other asset design for the game. At launch, Torbjörn would have to place a turret and then hammer on it to bring it up to a higher level, while his ultimate Molten Core would be used to give him a burst of energy and speed as well as briefly upgrading the turret to its highest value. Torbjörn could also collect scrap left by fallen players, when he then could use to make armor pickups for his allies. Lead game designer Geoff Goodman called Torbjörn a "little overly defensive focused", and wanted to make the hero more capable on offense in non-payload map. These new updates were added in an October 2018 patch.

Torbjörn is voiced by Keith Silverstein.

Tracer

Tracer, real name Lena Oxton, is a British pilot and adventurer. She wields dual rapid-fire Pulse Pistols, and is equipped with a "chronal accelerator" which grants her the ability to either jump forward in time, crossing many meters in a split second (Blink) or rewind three seconds into the past to heal and restore ammunition (Recall). Her ultimate ability is Pulse Bomb, an explosive charge that sticks to enemies, exploding after a brief delay for massive damage.

Born in London following the events of the Omnic Crisis, Lena Oxton became the youngest test pilot in Overwatch's experimental flight program, and was tapped to test the "Slipstream", a fighter jet that used teleportation technology. During the test flight, a malfunction caused the craft to vanish and Tracer along with it. She was presumed dead. However, she reappeared months later, though now with a condition preventing her from maintaining a physical form and which caused her to vanish for hours or even days at a time. It was discovered that the accident desynchronized her molecules from time itself, a condition eventually called "chronal disassociation." The enhanced gorilla scientist Winston invented the chronal accelerator to re-synchronize her with the normal flow of time.

Tracer was the first Hero developed for the game and used to test the gameplay mechanics. Tracer features in the cinematic trailer, teamed with Winston as she tries to stop Widowmaker and Reaper from taking Doomfist's gauntlet. She also appears in the cinematic short Alive, as she unsuccessfully tries to stop Widowmaker from assassinating the omnic monk Tekhartha Mondatta in London. Tracer is featured on the game's cover art, and is a playable hero in Heroes of the Storm. It was revealed in an Overwatch comic that she identifies as a lesbian.

Tracer is voiced by Cara Theobold.

Widowmaker

Widowmaker, real name Amélie Lacroix, is a French sniper and assassin. She wields the Widow's Kiss, a versatile rifle that fires in full automatic at close-range, and can convert into a sniper rifle for long-range kills. She also uses a Grappling Hook to reach high ledges and Venom Mines to disable enemies. Her ultimate ability is Infra-Sight, which activates her recon visor to highlight all enemies through walls for her and her team, similar to a wallhack.

Amélie was a ballet dancer and was the wife of Gérard Lacroix, an Overwatch agent heading operations against the terrorist organization known as Talon. When their assassins were unable to get close to Lacroix, they kidnapped Amélie and reprogrammed her as a sleeper agent. She was found and returned home by Overwatch agents, unaware of what had happened; two weeks later, she killed her husband in his sleep. Returning to Talon, she underwent extensive training in the covert arts, and her physiology was altered to slow her heart, turning her skin blue. Her emotional responses numbed by the conditioning, she feels little more than the satisfaction of the kill.

Widowmaker appears in the intro cinematic, teamed with Reaper to steal Doomfist's gauntlet from the Overwatch Museum; a boy visiting the museum uses it against her. She is also featured in the animated short Alive, on a mission to assassinate the omnic monk Tekhartha Mondatta, an advocate for peaceful human-omnic relations.

Widowmaker was the most popular defense character during the game's open beta.

Widowmaker is voiced by Chloé Hollings.

Support heroes
Support heroes typically lack any significant offensive abilities and instead provide support for their teammates, most often in the form of healing or other buffs. They may also be able to apply debuffs to the opposing team, making them more prone to attack. Support heroes tend to have the fewest hit points but also can self-regenerate their health at times.

Ana
Ana Amari is an Egyptian sniper and bounty hunter, and one of the founding members of Overwatch. She wields a Biotic Rifle loaded with smart darts that damage enemies and heal allies, as well as a sidearm that fires Sleep Darts. She also carries Biotic Grenades that disable enemy healing and boost ally healing. Her ultimate ability is Nano Boost, which grants an attack and defense boost to a teammate hero.

Hailing from Cairo, Ana Amari was considered the best sniper in the world, and rushed in to support the unprepared Egyptian defense forces during the Omnic Crisis. Her marksmanship and her critical decision-making skills led to her being recruited by Overwatch, and she served for many years as Jack Morrison's second-in-command during the conflict, while trying to be a mother to her daughter, Fareeha. Even with her command responsibility, Ana refused to give up going on combat missions. Remaining in service well into her fifties, Ana was believed to have been killed by Widowmaker during a hostage rescue; when Ana hesitated to make the kill shot, realizing that her target had in fact been her friend Amélie Lacroix, Widowmaker shot her through her rifle's lens, destroying her right eye, then proceeded to kill the hostages. Though Ana survived, Overwatch soon disbanded. Initially choosing to remain out of combat as the world became embroiled in conflict, Ana realized she could not remain on the sidelines, and has rejoined the battle to protect her homeland.

Ana had already been part of the narrative of Overwatch from the creation of the Pharah character, according to Blizzard's lead writer Michael Chu; they wanted Pharah's parents to be important characters of the Overwatch group that would influence Pharah, and Ana had been established as a sniper in Pharah's story. When they started brainstorming new playable heroes, the idea of an alchemist was raised, leading to the concept of a "skill-based support healer", according to Chu. This led to them to consider making Ana this new playable character, as these support sniper skills would contrast well against those of the already-established character of Widowmaker. Ana was the first character to be added to Overwatch following its launch; she was announced and available to play on the Public Test regions on July 12, 2016, and was playable by all PC and console players on July 19, 2016. In January 2019, Blizzard published a short story "Bastet" that focused on Ana and her relationship with Soldier: 76. The story was written by Michael Chu and illustrated by Arnold Tsang. Alongside this, Blizzard ran the first of a mini-event, a two-week long "Ana's Bastet Challenge" that awarded players that won a number of games across any mode, or watched designated Twitch streams with cosmetics related to this story.

Ana appears as a playable hero in Heroes of the Storm.

Ana is voiced by Aysha Selim.

Baptiste
Baptiste, full name Jean-Baptiste Augustin, is a Haitian combat medic and former operative of Talon. His main weapon is a Medic SMG, a submachine gun alongside a secondary Biotic Launcher that fires projectiles that heal allies in their area of effect. As a passive ability, Baptiste's Exo Boots allow him to jump higher after crouching. His active abilities includes a Regenerative Burst that heals himself and nearby allies over a short period of time, and an Immortality Field device that prevents teammates from dying while in range, but the device itself can be destroyed prematurely.  His ultimate is an Amplification Matrix that increases damage and healing effects of allies' shots that pass through it.

Originally from Tortuga, Baptiste was among the thirty million children orphaned by the Omnic Crisis. He enlisted in the military of the Caribbean Coalition, an alliance of island nations united by the crisis, as a combat medic, driven by his desire to help others; he would eventually rise to become part of the Coalition's special ops division. After the end of the war, Baptiste struggled to find work until he was recruited by Talon, one of a number of mercenary groups that arose in the aftermath of the crisis. At first, he thrived within Talon, which gave him easy assignments that paid well enough for him to establish a clinic in his hometown. As time went on, however, the missions his unit was sent on became increasingly violent, including assassinations of rivals and operations that involved civilian casualties. Disgusted, Baptiste abandoned Talon and set out to wander the world, offering his aid where he could. Realizing that Baptiste knew too much about their operations, Talon regularly sent assassins, including members of his former unit, to silence him, without success; those few who were able to locate him were never seen again.

After approximately a week of teases through their social media sites, Blizzard formally introduced Baptiste as the game's 30th hero with an origin story video on February 25, 2019, and was added to the PTR the following day. Baptiste was made live for all servers on March 19, 2019. In June 2019, Blizzard released "What You Left Behind" a short story about Baptiste's background written by Alissa Wong and illustrated by Arnold Tsang. Alongside the story, Blizzard ran a mini 2-week "Reunion" event that allowed players to earn skins and other cosmetics related to the story by winning matches across any mode and watching specific Twitch streams.

Baptiste is voiced by Benz Antoine. Antoine had gotten the role in part for his ability to speak Creole with a French accent.

Brigitte

Brigitte Lindholm is a Swedish engineer and adventurer, who wears powered armor similar to Reinhardt. She wields a Rocket Flail that allows her to strike several enemies in close range, and can be thrown in a Whip Shot to hit distant targets and knock them back. She has the ability to engage a Barrier Shield to protect herself and others behind it from damage for a limited time, and when it is active, she can charge a short distance forward in a Shield Bash, stunning the first enemy she hits. She is also able to throw Repair Packs that can help heal other allies. Her Ultimate ability is Rally that allows her to move faster, and provide nearby allies with additional armor while the ability is active.

Brigitte is the youngest daughter of Torbjörn Lindholm, Overwatch's former chief engineer. She was named by her godfather Reinhardt Wilhelm, to whom Torbjörn and his pregnant wife Ingrid were indebted to after Reinhardt saved his life during "Operation White Dome" in Istanbul. As such, Brigitte became close friends with Reinhardt, and grew up on his tales of heroes and chivalry. While Torbjörn was more interested in creating weapons, Brigitte's aptitudes were for creating armor and defensive systems. After the fall of Overwatch, Reinhardt elected to travel the world as something of a knight-errant, and Brigitte, to his surprise, asked him if she could accompany him as his squire, to which he agreed. Her job included maintaining Reinhardt's Crusader armor, to which she was well-suited as it was based on a design created by her father, but as time went on, she was often required to take care of Reinhardt himself, who maintained an overenthusiasm for combat in spite of his increasing age and frailty. Eventually she decided that just maintaining Reinhardt's armor was not enough, and had Reinhardt train her in combat while she created her own suit of armor in secret, so that she could fight alongside him. She accompanies Reinhardt to answer Winston's Overwatch recall.

She appears in the digital comics Dragon Slayer and Reflections. She also appears in the animated short Honor and Glory, where she protests Reinhardt rejoining Overwatch, only for him to explain why he must go back.

After about a week of teasing her announcement, Brigitte was confirmed to be the 27th Hero on February 28, 2018, and was made available to try on the PTR the same day. Brigitte was released for play on all servers on March 20, 2018. Kaplan described Brigitte as an "interesting hybrid character", as while she is classified as support, she has many similarities to a tank character. She combines certain elements of Reinhardt (armor and shield) and Torbjörn (providing armor to her allies); as her chosen weapon is a flail, she also bears some similarities to the Crusader class in Diablo III. Brigitte's reveal brought a return of a joking comparison between Overwatch and Paladins by Hi-Rez Studios, a game that also used pre-determine hero characters which had earlier been accused by players of copying the style of Overwatch though ultimately dropped; Hi-Rez's Stewart Chisam pointed out on social media how Brigitte appeared similar in looks and abilities to their character Ash, released in mid-2017.

Brigitte is voiced by Matilda Smedius.

Kiriko

Kiriko Kamori is a Japanese ninja who was trained by her mother alongside the Shimada brothers, Genji and Hanzo. Her primary tools are Healing Ofuda, paper projectiles imbued with healing powers that can home in on allies in line of sight. Her secondary tools are fast, low-damage Kunai knife projectiles that do increased damage if they land a critical hit. She can also Wall Climb as Genji and Hanzo do. She is able to Swift Step and teleport to an ally even through walls, and cast a Protection Suzu to grant allies within range a debuff cleanse and temporary invulnerability. Her Ultimate ability is the Kitsune Rush, which creates a fox spirit that runs through torii gates. Allies near this path will gain improved ground speed and buffs to attack, reload, and cooldown speeds.

Kiriko’s grandmother taught her to worship the fox spirit, which helped shape her fighting style. Her mother, Asa Yamagami, trained both Kiriko and the Shimada brothers in the way of the sword. As a result, Kiriko grew up and learned alongside Genji and Hanzo. She was also considered a “cute little niece figure” and a close family friend to the Shimada brothers. Her father, Toshiro Yamagami, was abducted by the Hashimoto clan years prior and forced to produce weapons for them. The Hashimoto took over Kanezaka following the fall of the Shimada and caused suffering among the populace. In response, Kiriko joins the vigilante group, Yokai, and currently fights to protect her home from the Hashimoto and other threats. 

Kiriko was the first hero to be introduced following Overwatch 2 launch in October 2022, and the first to be made available as a free reward on a seasonal battle pass. Her design was based on the new 5 vs. 5 approach used in Overwatch 2.

Kiriko is voiced by Sally Amaki.

Lúcio
Lúcio Correia dos Santos is a Brazilian DJ and freedom fighter. He is equipped with futuristic roller blades that allow him to skate on walls, (Wall Ride) which gives him large speed boosts when jumping off said walls. He is also armed with a Sonic Amplifier gun that can damage enemies in bursts of four. He can also use his Sonic Amplifier to knock enemies back with the ability Soundwave (Commonly called a Boop). He can use music to either heal his teammates or increase their movement speed (Crossfade), and can amplify his music to boost the effects (Amp It Up). His ultimate ability, Sound Barrier, grants powerful temporary shielding to himself and nearby allies. Jeff Kaplan stated that Lucio was based on the tabletop role-playing game archetype of bards who are able to cast ability-boosting auras on their party.

Lúcio Correia dos Santos grew up in Rio de Janeiro during the financial upheaval caused by the Omnic Crisis. He turned to music to lift up the spirits of his disheartened people by performing on street corners and at block parties. When the Vishkar Corporation, a multinational conglomerate, moved in to redevelop Rio, they began to crack down on its citizens with curfews and exploit them as cheap labor. Lúcio stole a Vishkar sonic weapon and used it against them, thus rallying the people to rise up and drive Vishkar out of their neighborhoods. His leadership made him a global celebrity, and he began to perform in filled arenas worldwide.

Blizzard announced in February 2017 that Lúcio would be added as a hero character to Heroes of the Storm and would possess similar healing and support capabilities in that game. Blizzard also distributed "Lúcio-Ohs" breakfast cereal through Kellogg's in early 2019, inspired by one of Lúcio's in-game sprays.

Lúcio is voiced by Jonny Cruz.

Mercy

Mercy, real name Angela Ziegler, is a Swiss field medic and first responder. She wears a winged Valkyrie suit, which allows her to rush towards targeted teammates through the air (Guardian Angel), as well as slow her own descent while falling (Angelic Descent). She wields a Caduceus Staff that alternately heals her teammates or boosts their damage output, and also carries a medium-range Caduceus Blaster as a sidearm. Her Resurrect ability allows her to revive one fallen ally. Her ultimate ability is Valkyrie, which boosts her healing and attack boosts, firing rate, and Resurrect cooldown; gives her the ability to fly; and gives her infinite ammunition for a brief period.

Angela Ziegler was head of surgery at a Swiss hospital when she developed specialized applied nanobiology to heal injuries. Her work earned her the attention of Overwatch, who recruited her as their chief medical researcher. The Valkyrie suit she wears was her own design. Though opposed to Overwatch's militaristic approach as a result of losing her parents to war, she knew that their resources allowed her to save lives on a global scale. When Overwatch disbanded, she dedicated herself to helping those who were affected by decades of global war.

Mercy was the most popular support character during the game's open beta. Like Symmetra, Mercy saw a major redesign in a September 2017 update, as her initial ultimate ability, Resurrect, which could be used to bring all downed players in a small radius back to full health, encouraged Mercy players to stay out of battle.

Mercy is voiced by Lucie Pohl.

Moira

Moira O'Deorain is an Irish geneticist, a leading member of Talon, and Minister of Genetics for the city of Oasis. Her main weapon is the Biotic Grasp, which drains the health and biotic energy of enemies; this biotic energy can then be sprayed out in a cone to heal her allies. Her skills include Fade, allowing her to teleport a short distance, and Biotic Orb, a rebounding sphere that can either heal nearby allies or damage nearby enemies. Her ultimate ability is Coalescence, a beam that heals all allies and injures all opponents it passes, bypassing any barriers that may be in place.

Originally from Dublin, Moira O'Deorain made waves in the scientific community more than a decade prior to the game, after publishing a controversial paper detailing a methodology for creating custom genetic programs that could alter DNA at a cellular level. Most scientists found her research dangerous due to its perceived ethical shortfalls, with some even going so far as to accuse her of having the same obsession with scientific advancement that started the Omnic Crisis. Adding to the controversy, other geneticists were unable to reproduce the results of her research. With her career stalled, Moira received a lifeline from an unlikely source: Blackwatch, the covert ops division of Overwatch under the command of Gabriel Reyes. Her involvement with Blackwatch was kept a secret until inquiries following an incident in Venice (played out in the story-based game mode "Retribution") revealed her work, forcing Overwatch to publicly disavow any ties to her or her work. After Overwatch disbanded, Moira was employed by the Ministries, the scientific collective that founded the city of Oasis in southern Iraq, as the head of the Ministry of Genetics. She was also financed by Talon, and (along with Doomfist and Reaper) is among the members of its ruling council who appear in the game. Her origin story video reveals that she is responsible for transforming Gabriel Reyes into Reaper. She had made an appearance in Doomfist's introductory comic, released earlier in 2017.

Moira was announced at BlizzCon 2017 as the game's 26th hero on November 3, 2017, and was made available to play on the Public Test Region a few days later. Moira was added for all players in all regions on November 16, 2017. Kaplan said that Moira had been in the works for months well prior to this, having anticipated that the Overwatch player base had been asking for another healer character. Kaplan believed that Moira's fit as a healer depended on team compositions where teammates stay in close proximity to each other, but that her abilities could help support those that tend to separate from the group, like Genji. Art-wise, she was envisioned by Arnold Tsang to be a warlock- or mage-like character, with robes, sleeves and hand motions that evoked the use of magic. This subsequently created some difficulty with her character animations, specifically her sleeves; while the artists had previously animated long flowing clothes for Reaper, animating sleeves with Moira's complex hand movements took several months. This particularly was true for her Legendary skins, which animator Hak Lee said took between three and five months to properly animate. Moira's animations in game were found by some journalists to be close references to various anime, such as her running animation being similar to that of Naruto Uzumaki from the anime Naruto. Chu acknowledged that many members of Blizzard's animation team are anime fans and some references had filtered into characters and customization items, and for Moira, the anime-like touches helped to make her character visually distinctive during fast-paced battles.

Moira is voiced by Genevieve O'Reilly, an Irish actress that Chu said was perfect for the role.

Zenyatta
Tekhartha Zenyatta is an omnic monk and wanderer. Rather than moving on foot, he floats above the ground in a meditative pose. He is surrounded by a circle of 8 floating metal orbs named the Orbs of Destruction (resembling prayer beads), which he can use to launch a form of energy to damage foes either one at a time or through a charged-shot. He can also cast these orbs onto teammates as Orbs of Harmony to regenerate health, or onto enemies as Orbs of Discord to lower their defenses. His ultimate ability is Transcendence, which makes him temporarily invulnerable and applies massive regenerative effects to his allies in a large radius around him.

Zenyatta belonged to the Shambali, an order of omnic monks that had settled in a monastery deep within the Himalayas in northern Nepal, after experiencing a "spiritual awakening" that led them to believe that, like humans, omnics also possessed a soul. Their leader, Tekhartha Mondatta, sought to heal the rift between humans and omnics and bring them into societal harmony through peaceful public rallies, one of which resulted in Mondatta's assassination by Widowmaker in London. Zenyatta disagreed with this approach, believing that only directly engaging humans and connecting with them person-to-person would bridge the divide between man and machine. He left the Shambali monastery and wandered the world, seeking to help those he met to find inner peace, including cyborg warrior Genji. He aided Genji in becoming more relaxed and understanding the purpose of his metallic body.

Zenyatta is voiced by Feodor Chin.

Non-playable characters
The following are characters who appear in other Overwatch media.

Antonio Bartalotti
Antonio Bartalotti was an Italian businessman and member of Talon who orchestrated a terrorist attack on Overwatch's headquarters in Oslo, Norway, in the comic "Retribution". He was killed by Gabriel Reyes during the events of the story-based game mode of the same name.

Athena
Athena is Winston's personal artificial intelligence, who supervises his vitals and keeps track of all former Overwatch agents. Together, she and Winston were able to activate the Recall that contacted all the agents at the beginning of the Second Omnic Crisis, which initiates the events of the game. She also serves as the in-game announcer.

Athena is voiced by Evelyn Duah.

Balderich von Adler
Colonel Balderich von Adler was the commander of the Crusaders, a German paramilitary unit composed of armored warriors with rocket hammers and hard-light shields that served as support to the Bundeswehr, the regular German military. Balderich was approached by Overwatch to become one of its founding members during the Omnic Crisis, but was forced to lead a defense against an army of Bastions in his home village of Eichenwalde, in the Black Forest near Stuttgart. It was during this battle that the omnics unleashed the OR14 (a progenitor to the OR15 on which Orisa is based), which overwhelmed the Crusaders and their army comrades. Retreating into Eichenwalde Castle with his friend and lieutenant Reinhardt Wilhelm, Balderich intended to stand his ground there, sending Reinhardt to protect the other troops, and giving him his Overwatch initiation medal. Armed with both his and Reinhardt's rocket hammers, Balderich held the line inside Eichenwalde Castle, destroying at least a large number of omnics to prevent them from overwhelming Reinhardt and the remaining troops, who at that point were at full retreat, that he was protecting, after which then he collapsed into the throne in the castle's great hall and died from his injuries. Many years later, Reinhardt - living in the ruins of Eichenwalde - left his tarnished Overwatch medallion on the arm of the throne next to his friend's body, before leaving to answer Winston's call to arms.

These events are briefly shown in the animated short The Last Bastion, and in more detail in Honor and Glory, while the "Eichenwalde" map sees one team trying to protect Balderich's remains in the castle from the other advancing team.

Balderich von Adler is voiced by Michael Piatt.

Dae-hyun
Dae-hyun is a MEKA mechanic assigned to D.Va and a childhood friend of hers. He and D.Va have been working together in the MEKA unit. He was introduced in August 2018 in the animated short Shooting Star, in which he helps D.Va defend Busan from the recurring omnic threat known locally as gwishin.

Dae-hyun is voiced by Johnny Young.

Efi Oladele
Efi Oladele is an 11-year-old scientist and inventor from the in-universe region of Numbani. After her parents gave her a robotic kit, she became interested in robotics and artificial intelligence. She witnessed Doomfist's attack on Numbani, which damaged several OR15 defensive Omnics, and was inspired to use her skills to create Orisa from one of the damaged units. The introduction of Orisa as a playable character in February 2017 was preceded by biographical introductions to Efi on the various Overwatch social media sites.

Emily
Emily is Tracer's girlfriend. She is an English woman living in London, with whom Tracer and Winston spent the holidays. She first appears in the comic "Reflections", where Tracer shops for her Christmas present. It is unknown how long she and Tracer have been dating, but Winston does consider her family.

The introduction of Emily was lauded by critics and the LGBT community for confirming Tracer as the game's first LGBT character.

Hal-Fred Glitchbot
Hal-Fred Glitchbot is a famous omnic film director, known for his works such as They Came From Beyond the Moon. As an omnic, he receives much prejudice from society, including being the recipient of assassination attempts. On the map Hollywood, the offensive team must escort his limousine to his trailer, while the defense must stop them. He is known for hurling insults at the players, which vary depending on which characters are being played.

His name is a play on famous real-world director Alfred Hitchcock, and the computer HAL 9000 from the 1968 film 2001: A Space Odyssey.

Hal-Fred Glitchbot is voiced by Travis Willingham.

Dr. Harold Winston
Dr. Harold Winston was the chief scientist of the Horizon Lunar Colony, a research base on the Moon where a group of genetically engineered gorillas and primates resided to test the long-term effects of living in space. Harold took a special interest in one young gorilla who showed a great curiosity for the world around him, beginning with stealing Harold's glasses because he thought there would be more to see. Showing the young gorilla a view of Earth, Harold gave him a piece of advice he remembered years later: "Never accept the world as it appears to be. Dare to see it for what it could be."

When the other gorillas on the moon base rebelled, Harold and the other human scientists were killed; his prodigy took his name "Winston" to honor his fallen mentor, and escaped to Earth in a scratch-built rocket. Winston also kept Harold's glasses, as well as a photograph of the two of them at the Horizon colony.

Dr. Harold Winston is voiced by Greg Chun.

Katya Volskaya
Katya Volskaya is the CEO and head of the Volskaya Industries, a robotic company with the purpose of ending the lives of the Omnic.

Volskaya was first seen in the animated short Infiltration where she was subject to an assassination by Sombra, Reaper and Widowmaker. However, Sombra hacks the alarms and puts the events into motion that ensures her safety. It is then revealed by Sombra, when she confronts Volskaya, that she has information that the technology she uses in her mechs was actually Omnic to start. Sombra blackmails Katya and in return, she is kept alive. In the final scene, Volskaya hires Zarya to hunt down and kill Sombra.

Katya Volskaya is voiced by Gulmira Mamedova.

Mauga
Mauga is a close companion of Baptiste, introduced in Baptiste's origin story "What You Left Behind". A giant of a man, Mauga befriended Baptiste in his early days in the Talon organization. Baptiste, in turn, became one of the few people to be able to try to calm Mauga's wild tendencies. While Mauga thrived within Talon, Baptiste soon grew distant from it and left. In the years that followed, the two still met once in a while on questionable terms but treating each other as old friends.

Mauga was intended to be Hero 31, but according to Kaplan, as they developed the skill kit for this character, they found it didn't fit the personality that they had established for Mauga in the media. Kaplan states they still plan to introduce Mauga as a hero character in the future. Instead, they designed a new character, Sigma, to use that developed kit.

Maximilien
Maximilien is a wealthy omnic and a member of Talon's inner council, who handles the organization's finances. He first appears in the comic "Masquerade", where he is seen operating a casino in Monaco. In the story-based game mode "Storm Rising" he is captured by Tracer, Genji, Winston, and Mercy after a pursuit in Havana, Cuba.

Maximilien is voiced by Stéphane Cornicard.

MEKA
MEKA, the Mobile Exo-Force of the Korean Army, is a Busan-based squad of mecha pilots, including D.Va, that protect Korea and nearby states from regular attacks by an omnic colossus known locally as the gwishin. MEKA's pilots were drawn from pro-esports and other similarly skilled areas, such as auto racing, after the gwishin disrupted the ability to use drone mechs. The MEKA squad is overseen by Captain Myung (voiced by Cathy Shim in-game, on Busan), and besides D.Va, includes pilots Kyung-soo "King" Han, Yuna "D.mon" Lee, Seung-hwa "Overlord" Si, and Jae-Eun "Casino" Gwon. D.Va herself is supported by Dae-hyun, a childhood friend and mechanic. While MEKA was discussed in prior Overwatch media, more details of the squad were revealed as part of the August 2018 release of Shooting Star, an animation short focused on D.Va, and the release of the Busan map that incorporates more of the MEKA lore.

Mina Liao
Dr. Mina Liao is one of the scientists at the Omnica Corporation that created the Omnics, and upon Omnic Crisis, was invited to join Overwatch to fight them as a founding member, along with Jack Morrison, Gabriel Reyes, Ana Amari, Torbjörn Lindholm, and Reinhardt Wilhelm. During her time at Overwatch, she created the Omnic Echo as a benevolent artificial intelligence hoping that it would help save humanity. She was killed during an attack on Overwatch headquarters, and Echo took her personality as part of her legacy.

Pachimari
Pachimari are toys that appear through various Overwatch maps, customization items, and additional media. They are anime-like creatures shaped like an upside-down onion with cephalopod-type legs. Blizzard created the Pachimaris as they needed toys to populate UFO catchers on the Hanamura map. Their design was created by concept artist David Kang, who named them Pachimari after the Korean word for "onion". Blizzard did not expect there to be much interest in Pachimari, but there was a great deal of fan attention in the characters, with unlicensed plush toys, clothing, and other merchandise made by fans. Seeing this, Blizzard incorporated additional Pachimari into the game and its media, including placing a "King Pachimari" atop the payload for the Junkertown map, and licensed official plush toys for purchase. Since then, Blizzard has stated there is lore behind Pachimari that they are waiting to introduce.

Tekhartha Mondatta
Tekhartha Mondatta was an omnic monk and leader of the Shambali. In the years following the Omnic Crisis, Mondatta and a group of other omnics abandoned their pre-programmed lives and settled in a communal monastery in Nepal, where they meditated on the nature of existence and came to believe that they were more than just "artificial"—they possessed their own souls, just as humans did. Mondatta was a leader in advocating peace between humans and omnics and healing the wounds following the Omnic Crisis, and traveled the world spreading his message. Mondatta was assassinated by Widowmaker during a rally in London, despite heavy security and the efforts of Tracer. In the King's Row map, a statue of him holding the hand of a human child stands near the spot where he was killed.

Mondatta and Zenyatta take their names from Zenyatta Mondatta, a 1980 album by English rock band The Police.

Tekharha Mondatta is voiced by Sendhil Ramamurthy.

Notes

References

External links
 

Overwatch
 
Fictional soldiers in video games
Overwatch